Polevoy is a rural locality (a settlement) in Novooskolsky District, Belgorod Oblast, Russia. The population was 275 as of 2010. There are 3 streets.

Geography 
Polevoy is located 30 km west of Novy Oskol (the district's administrative centre) by road. Novosyolovka is the nearest rural locality.

References 

Rural localities in Novooskolsky District

Renamed localities of Belgorod Oblast